Forbidden Drama is the debut studio album from the alternative/progressive rock band byron. Released on 12 October 2007 in Bucharest, it contains the single Essential Piece. This single charted for a very long while on national radio stations, including City FM and Radio Total. The real hit, however, would turn out to be the second single, "Blow Up My Tears", which would stay at No. 1 in City FM's RomTop for several weeks.  "Forbidden Drama" features a wide array of instruments including a string quartet, oboe and esraj. The album was manufactured and distributed by Romanian label A&A Records.

Music

The album features an eclectic mix of art rock and adult-alternative, with progressive and classical hints. The band themselves acknowledge having been influenced by Queen, Jethro Tull, Peter Gabriel or My Brightest Diamond. Some reviewers noted certain Chris Cornell and Bryan Ferry influences in Dan Byron's vocals, while the music exhibited progressive overtones which drew comparisons with Dream Theater and Genesis.

Concept

Forbidden Drama was conceived as a concept album, with 13 songs structured like a theatre play – with three acts and an epilogue. The lyrics deal with topics of alienation, consumerism, herd behavior, breaking the mold and the freedom of the individual. These themes were in part inspired by the bands' own history, given that their manager was a "corporate type" and their guitar player has a background as a lawyer. The album therefore showcases a transition process, from the corporate, depersonalized life depicted in "Fake Life" to a more artful, carefree existence in "No Man's Land". The title was considered representative, as the modern society "forbids small-scale, personal dramas".

Track listing

Personnel

byron
Dan Byron – vocals, acoustic guitar, flute, triola;
Costin Oprea – electric guitar, backing vocals on "No Man's Land"
Cristi Mateşan – drums
6fingers – keyboards, backing vocals on "No Man's Land"
Gyergyay Szabolcs – bass

Additional musicians
Mihai Balabaş – violin
Iustin Galea – violin
Andreea Retegan – viola
Alexandru Gorneanu – cello
Miron Grigore – oboe
Rodica Gondiu – esraj
Peter Michaud – recitative on "Fake Life"
Iulian Pâslaru – backing vocals on "No Man's Land"
Codruţ Dumitrescu – backing vocals on "No Man's Land"

Production
Produced by byron and A&A Records
Executive producer – Andi Enache
Mixed and mastered by Victor Panfilov at Real Sound & Vision
Design – VERTICALS
Photography – Cristi Roşca, Dorian Radu, Anca Radu
Management – Codruţ Dumitrescu

References

Byron (band) albums
2007 albums
Concept albums